Steve Way (born December 28, 1990) is an American actor and comedian. He is best known for his recurring role as Steve, a friend of the lead character Ramy Hassan on the Hulu series Ramy. 

Way was born with muscular dystrophy, and in addition to being an entertainer, he is an advocate for disability rights and universal health care and for actors with disabilities in Hollywood. Way also works as a high school substitute teacher.

An August 2020 article about Way mentioned that he is working with Apple TV+ to develop his own series.

References

External links 

1990 births
Living people
American male comedians
Actors with disabilities
People with muscular dystrophy
Male actors from New Jersey
American male actors
Comedians from New Jersey